PSSRdb (Polymorphic Simple Sequence Repeats database) is a database of polymorphic simple sequence repeats

See also
 sequence repeats

References

External links
 http://www.cdfd.org.in/PSSRdb/

Biological databases
Repetitive DNA sequences